Thomas F. McGowan (August 11, 1925 – July 23, 1997) was an American attorney, politician, and jurist from New York who served as a member of the New York State Senate from 1966 to 1974. He was later a justice of the New York Supreme Court from 1974 to 1990.

Early life and education
McGowan was born on August 11, 1925, in Buffalo, New York. During World War II, he served in the United States Army, reaching the rank of corporal. He earned a Bachelor of Social Science in 1950 and M.Ed. in 1953 from Canisius College. He later earned a Juris Doctor from the University of Buffalo Law School in 1957

Career 
From 1947 to 1957, he was an officer in the Buffalo Police Department. After graduating from law school, he was admitted to the bar and practiced law in Buffalo. He served as assistant D.A. of Erie County, New York from 1957 to 1967, and entered politics as a Republican.

McGowan was a member of the board of supervisors of Erie County from 1962 to 1963 and a member of the New York State Senate from 1966 to 1974, sitting in the 176th, 177th, 178th, 179th and 180th New York State Legislatures. In November 1974, he was re-elected, but he resigned his seat upon appointment to the New York Supreme Court. In November 1976, he was elected to a 14-year term on the Supreme Court, remaining on the bench until the end of 1990. On September 18, 1991, he was appointed as a Judge of the Buffalo City Court, to fill the vacancy caused by the resignation of Alois Mazur, and remained on the bench until the end of the year.

Personal life 
In 1951, he married Dorothy Ann Rowe (1926–2011), and they had six children. McGowan died on July 23, 1997, in the veterans unit of Genesee Memorial Hospital in Batavia, New York. He was buried at Arlington National Cemetery.

References

External links

1925 births
1997 deaths
Politicians from Buffalo, New York
Republican Party New York (state) state senators
Canisius College alumni
University at Buffalo Law School alumni
New York Supreme Court Justices
County legislators in New York (state)
Burials at Arlington National Cemetery
20th-century American judges
Lawyers from Buffalo, New York
20th-century American politicians
20th-century American lawyers